The 2010 San Diego County Credit Union Poinsettia Bowl was a post-season college football bowl game between the San Diego State Aztecs and the Navy Midshipmen on December 23, 2010 at Qualcomm Stadium in San Diego, California. The sixth edition of the annual Poinsettia Bowl, which the Aztecs won 35–14, began at 5:00 PM PST and was broadcast on ESPN.

Teams

Navy Midshipmen

The 2010 game marked Navy's third appearance in the Poinsettia Bowl. Previously, they had defeated the Colorado State Rams 51–30 in the inaugural 2005 Poinsettia Bowl and lost 35–32 to the Utah Utes in the 2007 game.  At the end of the 2009 season, the Midshipmen upset the Missouri Tigers in the Texas Bowl with a score of 35–13. The 2010 game was the eighth straight bowl game appearance for the Midshipmen.

San Diego State Aztecs

This was San Diego State's first bowl appearance since the 1998 Las Vegas Bowl.  Under second year head coach Brady Hoke the Aztecs posted an 8–4 regular season record.  Although this is SDSU's first appearance in the Poinsettia bowl the game was the second time that the Aztecs played a bowl game at Qualcomm Stadium.  They were defeated by Iowa in the 1986 Holiday Bowl, 39–38. The Midshipmen and the Aztecs had previously played each other twice, in 1994 and 1997, with San Diego State winning both contests with scores of 56–14 and 45–31.

Pregame summary

Navy
Leading the Midshipmen were quarterback Ricky Dobbs, wide receiver Greg Jones, and linebacker Tyler Simmons.

San Diego State
Statistical leaders for the Aztecs were running back Ronnie Hillman, quarterback Ryan Lindley, and wide receiver DeMarco Sampson.

Game Summary
Following seven straight days of rain in Southern California (often referred to as a Pineapple Express), the San Diego River overflowed and the stadium and surrounding parking lot were flooded. Thanks to external pumps, the field was cleared the morning of the game.

Scoring summary

Final statistics

Hillman set a new bowl game record of 228 yards rushing, previously held by Navy's Adam Ballard since 2005.

References

Poinsettia Bowl
Poinsettia Bowl
Navy Midshipmen football bowl games
San Diego State Aztecs football bowl games
December 2010 sports events in the United States
2010 in sports in California
2010s in San Diego